The following is a list of ice hockey teams in New Brunswick, past and present. It includes the league(s) they play for, and championships won.

Minor Professional

American Hockey League

Junior

Quebec Major Junior Hockey League

Maritime Junior A Hockey League

Junior B Hockey Leagues

Junior C Hockey Leagues

Semi-professional, senior and amateur

Senior

University

League, regional and national championships

See also

Hockey New Brunswick
2006 Memorial Cup

References

New Brunswick teams

Ice hockey teams
Ice hockey teams in New Brunswick